David T. Vieira is the current member of the Massachusetts House of Representatives for the 3rd Barnstable district. Vieira is also a Falmouth town meeting member and has been Moderator of that body since 1998.

Vieira was born in Teaticket, Massachusetts.  He graduated from Falmouth High School and then studied at American University.  After his junior year of high school, in 1992, he attended Massachusetts American Legion Boys State and was elected to represent Massachusetts as a Senator at American Legion Boys Nation. He later earned an MPA degree from Suffolk University.  David is an Eagle Scout from Troop 42 out of East Falmouth.

See also
 2019–2020 Massachusetts legislature
 2021–2022 Massachusetts legislature

References

External links
http://votesmart.org/candidate/54354/david-vieira#.VB-GwBZvDWA

Suffolk University alumni
Republican Party members of the Massachusetts House of Representatives
People from Falmouth, Massachusetts
Living people
American University alumni
Year of birth missing (living people)
21st-century American politicians